I'm a Celebrity...Get Me Out of Here! returned for its twelfth series on 11 November 2012 and finished on 1 December 2012. Ant & Dec returned as main hosts, with Laura Whitmore and Joe Swash returning as hosts of spin-off show I'm a Celebrity...Get Me Out of Here! NOW!. On 16 June 2012, it was announced that Russell Kane would be leaving Get Me Out of Here! NOW!. He has been replaced by comedian Rob Beckett.

On 1 December 2012, the series was won by EastEnders actress Charlie Brooks, with Ashley Roberts and David Haye placed runner-up and third place respectively.

Celebrities
Prior to the official announcement of any of the celebrity participants, Nadine Dorries, the UK Conservative Party MP for Mid Bedfordshire, was suspended from her party for failing to tell the Chief Whip she could be absent from the House of Commons and her constituents for a month as she was to appear on the reality TV show and heavily criticised for opting to take part. She is also to be investigated by the Parliamentary Standards Officer over claims she may have breached the MPs' Code of Conduct, with Theresa May, the Home Secretary, added her concerns by saying it is "frankly" the job of MPs to be in their constituency and the House of Commons.

It has been revealed that boxer David Haye received an appearance fee of £165,000, which is about £100,000 more than the other contestants received. In addition to the higher appearance fee, Haye's contract stated that he must have access to a gym – which he was given.

The official line-up was announced on 7 November 2012.

Results and elimination
 Indicates that the celebrity was immune from the vote
 Indicates that the celebrity received the most votes from the public
 Indicates that the celebrity received the fewest votes and was eliminated immediately (no bottom two)
 Indicates that the celebrity was named as being in the bottom two
 Indicates that the celebrity received the second fewest votes and was not named in the bottom two

Notes
N.B. Bottom two is not a strict indication of the public vote as names are generally revealed "in no particular order".
 In order to win immunity from the first public vote all celebrities took part in a task called "Bush Buddies". They will then take part in a 'Bed Bugs' task, in which the first five who accumulate the most time in the beds will be given immunity, while the other six will face the public vote.
 All of the celebrities faced the public vote; the bottom two were revealed as Eric and Colin. The other celebrities were declared safe and on Day 17 both Eric and Colin faced a bushtucker trial called "The Panic Rooms". Eric won the trial, while Colin was sent home.
 The public were voting for the celebrity they wanted to win rather than to save.

Bushtucker trials
The contestants take part in daily trials to earn food

 The public voted for who they wanted to face the trial
 The contestants decided who did which trial
 The trial was compulsory and neither the public or celebrities decided who took part

Notes
 The celebrities were separated into two teams, based on how they travelled into the jungle. The winning team would stay in 'Croc Creek', the more luxurious of the two camps in the jungle. The losing team would move into the 'Snake Rock'.
 Both Helen and Nadine quit the trial, therefore neither were rewarded the food for their camps.
 Nadine won by eating four meals. Therefore, she won four meals for her camp.
 Helen originally won four stars, but they were disallowed as she grabbed them with her hands instead of her mouth.
 After the klaxon sounded, Helen stepped off the wheel and refused to do the trial. This marks the third time in I'm a Celebrity history that a contestant has refused to do a trial, after Kerry Katona in series 3 and Gillian McKeith in series 10 which Ant and Dec allowed.
 Colin and Rosemary were excluded from this trial on medical grounds.
 This trial decided who left the camp between Eric and Colin and how the camp would be fed that night. Charlie took part with Colin, and Rosemary with Eric. Each celebrity had to collect as many stars as they can to stay in camp, it was then revealed on Day 17 that Colin had collected fewer stars than Eric, so had to leave the jungle.
 This trial was originally attempted by Helen, but as she quit the trial, it was decided for it to be re-attempted by David.

Star count

Dingo Dollar challenges
This series, the 'Celebrity Chest' games have been replaced with the 'Dingo Dollar Challenges'. In a similar style to the celebrity chest, one member from each camp (Croc Creek and Snake Rock) will go head-to-head to win the 'Dingo Dollars'. The winning celebrity can then take the dollars to the 'Outback Shack', where they can exchange them for camp luxuries with kiosk Keith. Two options are given and the celebrity can choose which they'd would like to win. However, to win their luxury, a question is asked to the celebrities still in camp via the telephone box. If the question is answered correctly, the celebrity who won the challenge can take the items back to camp. If wrong, they receive nothing.

 The celebrities got the question correct
 The celebrities got the question wrong
Bold indicates that the celebrity won the challenge

Bush Buddy challenges
On the seventh day of the show, the celebrities were split into six pairs for the Bush Buddy Challenges, these were; Ashley and Hugo, Brian and David, Charlie and Linda, Colin and Rosemary, Eric and Nadine, Helen and Limahl. The celebrities were chained to their buddies and not allowed to be more than 4 ft away from each other.

Bold indicates which celebrity of the winning pair took part.

 David had to compete in both challenges as his partner Brian withdrew from the jungle for medical reasons in the morning of day 9.

The camps
For the first four days of the show, the celebrities were split between two separate camps known as "Croc Creek" and "Snake Rock".

The two camps merged in the early hours of Day 5, with the residents of Snake Rock relocating to the larger Croc Creek camp.

Rosemary and Limahl joined the camp on Day 5.

Episodes

Week 1

Week 2

Week 3

Ratings
Official ratings are taken from BARB. There were no shows on 14 and 20 November due to live football, however, the ITV2 show still aired as normal.

 Series averages do not include the Coming Out show.

Controversy and criticism

Nadine Dorries' participation
Nadine Dorries, a British politician and Conservative MP, was suspended from the parliamentary Conservative Party on 6 November 2012 owing to her decision to take part in I'm a Celebrity...Get Me Out of Here! without informing the Chief Whip. This sparked controversy during her time on the show.

Dorries became the first sitting MP to participate in a reality TV show since George Galloway (in January 2006 on Celebrity Big Brother) by spending up to a month on the show which ran from 11 November to 1 December 2012. Other Conservatives and her constituents were reportedly outraged by the announcement while the Conservative Chief Whip Sir George Young had not been informed of her imminent absence from Parliament. In fact, Dorries did not even inform the chairman of the Mid-Bedfordshire Conservative Association. Tim Montgomerie of the ConservativeHome website speculated that she might manage to "present an image of a Tory MP that defies some of the popular pre-conceptions and caricatures" while Lembit Öpik tweeted: "Good on Nadine Dorries for the jungle if she's really going in. Go gal!" The Conservative Party suspended Dorries from the party whip after her confirmation that she was planning to be absent from Parliament. John Lyon, the Parliamentary Commissioner for Standards, has received a complaint about her behaviour.

Helen Flanagan and bushtucker trials
On 14 November, Helen Flanagan was voted to complete the bushtucker trial. She had been voted to take part in every trial so far and had failed to win any stars. That day, Helen took on one of the show's most elaborate tasks yet, with a five-room hotel full of bugs for her to navigate around in the search for stars. However, she quit within minutes and failed to make it past the first room, returning to camp with no stars and therefore no food apart from basic rations.

Get Me Out of Here! NOW! host Whitmore claimed that the show's team weren't happy with Helen's "diva antics". She said: "Ant and Dec have lost patience with her and I think most of the crew hate her since she bailed out of the Bug Burial Trial," she told The Sun. She explained: "Months of preparation, health and safety checks goes into those trials. So to do all that and have Helen walk away after just ten seconds is annoying.". However Cruelty Towers was again featured on the 26 November episode where David Haye took part in.

Brian Conley's withdrawal
Following Brian Conley's withdrawal from the show on medical grounds, there was widespread criticism of the decision to allow him on the show, when he had a history of depression and other health problems. Before his withdrawal, Brian had been behaving in an emotional manner. ITV defended their decision, with a spokesman saying: "All contestants are assessed by independent medical experts before contracts are signed and again before entering the jungle. We also have contact where necessary with the celebrities' GPs. Medical personnel are also available 24 hours a day in Australia to provide support if needed."

References

External links
 

Episode list using the default LineColor
2012 British television seasons
12